

This is a list of the National Register of Historic Places listings in West Hartford, Connecticut.

This is intended to be a complete list of the properties and districts on the National Register of Historic Places in West Hartford, Connecticut, United States. The locations of National Register properties and districts for which the latitude and longitude coordinates are included below, may be seen in various online maps.

There are more than 400 properties and districts listed on the National Register in Hartford County, including 21 National Historic Landmarks. The 32 properties and districts located in the town of West Hartford include two National Historic Landmarks and are listed below. The properties and districts in the remaining parts of the county are listed separately. Six properties and districts straddle the border between West Hartford and Hartford and appear in both lists.

Current listings

|}

See also

List of National Historic Landmarks in Connecticut
National Register of Historic Places listings in Connecticut

References

 West Hartford